The 2014 Rialto Channel New Zealand Film Awards was the third presentation of the New Zealand Film Awards, a New Zealand film industry award. The 2014 ceremony took place in Shed 10 on Queen's Wharf in Auckland on Friday 12 December 2014. It was webcast live on the nzherald.co.nz website, and later broadcast on the Rialto Channel.

Nominees and Winners 

Moas were awarded in 28 categories in three groups – features, documentaries and short films. The 2013 category of Best Technical Contribution to a Short Film was dropped, and the new category Best Visual Effects added for 2014. The awards were dominated by the feature film The Dark Horse, which won six of its 13 nominated categories, including Best Film, Best Director and Best Actor.

Features 

Rialto Channel Best Film
 The Dark Horse
 Everything We Loved
 Housebound
 The Dead Lands
 The Last Saint

Flying Fish Best Director
 James Napier Robertson (The Dark Horse)
 Max Currie (Everything We Loved)
 Gerard Johnstone (Housebound)
 Toa Fraser (The Dead Lands)
 Rene Naufahu (The Last Saint)

Peter Yealands Wines Best Actor
 Cliff Curtis (The Dark Horse)
 Matt Whelan (3 Mile Limit)
 Nathan Meister (Realiti)
 James Rolleston (The Dead Lands)
 Beulah Koale (The Last Saint)

Peter Yealands Wines Best Actress
 Sia Trokenheim (Everything We Loved)
 Morgana O'Reilly (Housebound)
 Michelle Langstone (Realiti)
 Joy Vaele (The Last Saint)
 Antonia Prebble (The Cure)

Te Whanau O Waipareira Best Supporting Actor
 James Rolleston (The Dark Horse)
 Wayne Hapi (The Dark Horse)
 Leighton Cardno (Jake)
 Lawrence Makoare (The Dead Lands)
 Jonathan Brugh (What We Do in the Shadows)

Manukau Urban Maori Authority Best Supporting Actress
 Jackie van Beek (What We Do in the Shadows)
 Raukura Turei (The Dead Lands)
 Sophia Huybens (The Last Saint)
 Vanessa Rare (The Z-Nail Gang)
 Rima Te Wiata (Housebound)

Best Screenplay
 James Napier Robertson (The Dark Horse)
 Max Currie (Everything We Loved)
 Chad Taylor (Realiti)
 Glenn Standring (The Dead Lands)
 Rene Naufahu (The Last Saint)

Park Road Post Best Self Funded Film
 What We Do in the Shadows
 Jake
 Realiti
 3 Mile Limit
 The Z-Nail Gang

NZ On Air Best Television Feature
 Consent: The Louise Nicholas Story
 Erebus: Operation Overdue
 The Kick
 Field Punishment No 1
 Pirates of the Airwaves

MAC Best Makeup Design
 Davina Lamont (The Dead Lands)
 Jacinta Driver (Housebound)
 Brae Toia and Julie Clark (I Survived a Zombie Holocaust)
 Jane O'Kane (The Dark Horse)
 Dannelle Satherly (What We Do in the Shadows)

Best Costume Design
 Barbara Darragh (The Dead Lands)
 Lissy Patterson (Housebound)
 Gabrielle Stevenson (The Cure)
 Kristin Seth (The Dark Horse)
 Amanda Neale (What We Do in the Shadows)

Images & Sound Best Visual Effects
 George Zwier (The Dead Lands)
 Peter McCully (3 Mile Limit)
 Matthew Westbrooke (Housebound)
 Sam Scott (I Survived a Zombie Holocaust)
 Stan Alley (What We Do in the Shadows)

Bigpop Studios Best Sound
 Simon Riley, Mike Hedges and Tim Chaproniere (What We Do in the Shadows)
 Ben Sinclair, Chris Todd (Erewhon)
 Franklin Road Sound Post Production (Housebound)
 Chris Todd, Nick Buckton, Pete Smith, Tim Chaproniere, Fred Enholmer (The Dark Horse)
 Lee Herrick, James Hayday, Sven Taits and Adam Martin (The Dead Lands)

Bigpop Studios Best Score
 Dana Lund (The Dark Horse)
 Tom Mcleod (3 Mile Limit)
 Rachel Shearer (Erewhon)
 Victoria Kelly (Realiti)
 Don McGlashan (The Dead Lands)

Mandy VFX Best Editor
 Cushla Dillon (Orphans & Kingdoms)
 Dan Kircher (Everything We Loved)
 Peter Roberts (The Dark Horse)
 Dan Kircher (The Dead Lands)
 Eric de Beus (The Last Saint)

Tommy & James Best Production Design
 Ra Vincent (What We Do in the Shadows)
 Jane Bucknell & Anya Whitlock (Housebound)
 Kim Sinclair (The Dark Horse)
 Grant Major (The Dead Lands)
 Brant Fraser (The Last Saint)

Queenstown Camera ARRI Best Cinematography
 Dave Garbett (Everything We Loved)
 DJ Stipsen (3 Mile Limit)
 Simon Riera & Ado Greshoff (Housebound)
 Simon Raby (Orphans & Kingdoms)
 Denson Baker (The Dark Horse)

Letterboxd Best Poster Design
 Andrejs Skuja, Johnny Lyon (Housebound)
 Kirk Bremner, Luke Bremner (A Motel and a Hard Place)
 Rene Naufahu & Farini Jnr. (The Last Saint)
 Alastair Tye Samson, Doug Dillaman & Lucas Brooking (Jake)
 Jeremy Saunders (The Dead Lands)

Documentaries 

Best Documentary
 Hip Hop-eration
 Erebus: Operation Overdue
 Voices of the Land Nga Reo o te Whenua
 Cap Bocage
 Hot Air

Vendetta Films Best Documentary Director
 Bryn Evans (Hip Hop-eration)
 Peter Burger, & Charlotte Purdy (Erebus: Operation Overdue)
 Paul Wolffram (Voices of the Land – Nga Reo o te Whenua)
 Jim Marbrook (Cap Bocage)
 Gerard Smyth (Aunty and the Star People)

Lotech Best Documentary Editor
 Simon Coldrick (Erebus: Operation Overdue)
 Annie Collins (Voices of the Land – Nga Reo o te Whenua)
  Peter Roberts (Hip Hop-eration)
 Jim Marbrook and Prisca Bouchet (Cap Bocage)
 Abi King-Jones (Hot Air)

NZ Broadcasting School at CPIT Best Documentary Cinematography
 Bevan Crothers (Hip Hop-eration)
 Toby Ricketts (Manila – No Limitations)
 Alun Bollinger and Luke Frater (Voices of the Land – Nga Reo o te Whenua)
 James Ellis, Dave Perry (Into the Void)
 Gerard Smyth & Jacob Bryant (Aunty and the Star People)

Short films 

Canon Best Short Film
 Eleven
 Ross & Beth
 The Tide Keeper
 The Keeper
 Whisker

Halcyon Digital Best Self-Funded Short Film
 Skin
 Mi Amigo Mandarina
 The Last Night
 Over the Moon
 A Lesson on Probability

Actors Agents Association of New Zealand Best Short Film Actor
 John Clarke (Ross & Beth)
 Charlie Bleakley (Coconut)
 Alan James Drum-Garcia (Mi Amigo Mandarina)
 Cohen Holloway (The Last Night)
 Elliot Travers (Mis-Drop)

Actors Agents Association of New Zealand Best Short Film Actress
 Tahei Simpson (Home)
 Anna Jullienne (Over The Moon)
 Phoebe McLeod (Snip)
 Morgan Albrecht (After Wonderland)
 Hayley Sproull (School Night)

PLS Best Cinematography in a Short Film
 Grant McKinnon (Ross & Beth)
 Ben Montgomery, Chris Pryor (The Tide Keeper)
 Germain McMicking (The Keeper)
 Ian McCarroll (Whisker)
 Mathew Knight (The Last Night)

NZ Herald Online – Best Short Film Script
 Kate Prior (Eleven)
 Alyx Duncan (The Tide Keeper)
 Charlie Bleakley & Cohen Holloway (Coconut)
 Tom Furniss (Mi Amigo Mandarina)
 Hamish Bennett (Ross & Beth)

External links 
Rialto Channel New Zealand FIlm Awards

References 

New Zealand film awards
Film Awards
New Zealand
2010s in New Zealand cinema